An industrial musical is a musical performed internally for the employees or shareholders of a business to create a feeling of being part of a team, to entertain, and/or to educate and motivate the management and salespeople to improve sales and profits. It can be used to increase staff awareness of public relations, advertising, marketing or corporate image.

Other terms for industrial musicals include the corporate musical or industrial show, but the latter can also refer to trade shows, which are publicity events organized by businesses in a specific industry to promote their products to potential buyers.

Industrial musicals are not restricted to corporations or to businesses involved in industry. They should not be confused with industrial music or with musicals produced by businesses to be seen by the general public, such as Disney's stage production of The Lion King, for example.

History
Industrial musicals originated from company songs, anthems and jingles for promoting enthusiasm among workers. The songs were brought in by the management, as opposed to worker-created work songs. Internal musical groups could be formed to encourage company loyalty, keep employees happy, and to help advertise the company to the public. Early 20th century examples include IBM's internal songbook Songs of the IBM, and the Larkin Soap Company which organized community singing and had a women's drum corps, an orchestra, a ukulele club, and daily recitals on a pipe organ.

At some point, a collection of company songs was extended into a full musical theater format, and the industrial musical was born. Many of these musicals were made in North America during the economic boom that followed World War II, and this practice continued into the 1980s and 1990s.

The earliest known industrial musicals were produced by retail and automotive companies such as Ford, General Motors, and the Marshall Field's chain of department stores. By the end of the 1950s and throughout the 1960s, other types of businesses also began to put on shows. Some musicals were part of annual showcase events for presenting a company's new line of products.

Businesses could spend a lot of money to produce a musical, hiring talented Broadway composers and lyricists. The pay was very good, the task was challenging, and from the theatre's point of view, the production costs were much higher than a regular Broadway musical. Shows could have as many as 30 people in the cast and a 60-piece orchestra. Composer Hank Beebe estimates that the 1957 Chevrolet musical was budgeted at over 3 million dollars (U.S.), because it cost six times the amount it took to bring My Fair Lady to the stage that same year.

The song performances were rarely heard outside of the companies they were written for, but sometimes the employees would be given a souvenir record album. Some productions lasted for a limited number of nights, while others traveled from city to city for regional sales meetings. According to composer John Kander, who conducted several industrial shows early in his career and wrote the music for the 1966 General Electric industrial Go Fly a Kite (the complete score from which was issued on a 2-LP set that was given to GE employees), the cast albums for these industrial shows "were never intended for commercial release. [...] It was sort of a separate world." Yet it is largely through these rare albums that evidence of these shows has survived.

By the 1980s, industrial musicals were made less and less often. Jonathan Ward, a writer and DJ who collects industrial musical albums, theorizes that the reason for the decline was partially due to rising production costs for stage shows, and the availability of low-cost video and multimedia technology.

Ward thinks another reason for the decline was a change in work attitudes. In the 1950s and 1960s, employees might have expected to spend the majority of their working careers with one company. By the 1980s, employees and the management may have been less inclined to think this way. The feelings of company loyalty and community promoted in the song lyrics would have been met with more cynicism.

Some corporations, however, continued to successfully produce industrial musicals during the 1980s and 1990s and beyond. The Shaklee Corporation created its own in-house production company in 1980. Their team, led by producer Dale T. Hardin, director Craig Schaefer, and composer/lyricist Michael Reno created dozens of Shaklee Shows from concept to performance, and eventually branched out into in-house satellite TV. The Shaklee creative team created their own production company called "Command Performance Productions" that produced shows for other clients such as Charles Schwab and Marriott Lodging until 2000.

Despite the trends that affected industrial musicals, businesses have continued to make company songs. For example, KPMG produced a corporate anthem in 2001 titled "Our Vision of Global Strategy."

In 2013, the first book on the history of industrial musicals, titled Everything's Coming Up Profits, was published, written by Steve Young and Mike "Sport" Murphy. A series of industrial music audio anthologies, organized by decade, accompanied the book. In 2018, Bathtubs Over Broadway, a documentary on industrial musicals and Steve Young's quest to discover their creators, premiered at the Tribeca Film Festival.

Titles of industrial musicals
 1000 and One! – Oldsmobile (1954 for the '55 model year)
 A Fan Family Album – Westinghouse (1954) (History of electric fans)
 AM Route 66 – American Motors (1965 for the '66 model year)
 Building a Better Way to See the U.S.A. – Chevrolet (1971 for the '72 model year)
 Diesel Dazzle – General Motors (1966)
 Go Fly A Kite – General Electric (1966)
 Going Great! – American Motors (1963 for the '64 model year)
 Good News about Olds – Oldsmobile (1958 for the '59 model year)
 Got To Investigate Silicones – General Electric (1973) (about Silicones)
 Take It From Here – Xerox (1963 - for release of Xerox 813 copier)
 The Bathrooms Are Coming – American Standard (1969)
 The Chevrolet Experience – Chevrolet (1976 for the '77 model year)
 The Grip of Leadership – Coca-Cola (1961 - 75th anniversary)
 The Mighty "O" – Oldsmobile (1953 for the '54 model year)
 The Shape of Tomorrow – Westinghouse (1958)
 The Spark of Imagination – The Shaklee Corporation (1994)
 This is Oldsmobility – Oldsmobile (1957 for the '58 model year)
 This is the Year That Is! – Plymouth/Chrysler/Imperial (1964 for the '65 model year)
 Who Could Ask for Anything More? – Oldsmobile (1959 for the '60 model year)
 Wonderful World of Chemistry – E.I. du Pont de Nemours and Company (1964)
 You Belong in a Dodge - Dodge (1969 for the '70 model year)
 You're The Top – Oldsmobile (1960 for the '61 model year)

Composers and lyricists
 Hank Beebe
 Jerry Bock
 Michael Brown
 Sheldon Harnick
 Bill Heyer
 Max Hodge
 Kander and Ebb
 Sonny Kippe
 Lloyd Norlin
 Skip Redwine
 Michael Reno
 Raymond Scott
 Sid Siegel
 Wilson Stone
 Thomas Tierney
 Charles Title

See also
 Advertising
 Multi-image
 Musical theater
 Sponsored film

References

Further reading
 Barbaro, Michael (2006). A touch of Broadway near Bentonville. New York Times, June 3. (A musical at the 2006 Wal-Mart shareholder meeting.)
 Bathtubs
 Doane, Rex, et al. (2001). Corporate anthems. WNYC's April 7, 2001 broadcast of their radio show, On the Media. An interview with collector Steve Young and others.
 Ebenkamp, Becky (2001). Corporate America sings: musical shows about company products. Brandweek, April 23.
 International Business Machines Corporation (2004). IBM archives, Music chronology. Retrieved April 3, 2008.
The Fan Family Album 1945-1953, Hagley Library Finding Aid. Cinécraft Productions film collection.  Retrieved Aug. 10, 2022.
Kalish, Jon (2005). Industrial musicals offer odes to tractors, toilets. (Circulated to many newspapers via Reuters and Internet news sites in March 2005.)
McLaren, Carrie & Prelinger, Rick (1998). Salesnoise: a timeline of music & advertising. Stay Free 15, 14-23.
UTOPIA ON VINYL The history of the industrial musical, by  Jonathan Ward, Cabinet Magazine, issue 18, Summer 2005 
 Ward, Jonathan (2002). Recruit, train and motivate: the history of the industrial musical, Perfect Sound Forever (retrieved April 15, 2005)
Recruit, Train and Motivate: The History of the Industrial Musical, Pt. 2, by  Jonathan Ward, Perfect Sound Forever  (retrieved September 11, 2020)
 Ward, Jonathan (2004). Top 5 musicals produced by the oil industry. Retrieved July 6, 2009.
 Young, Steve and Sport Murphy (2013). Everything's Coming Up Profits: The Golden Age of the Industrial Musical. Retrieve April 21, 2018.
 BathtubsOverBroadway.com 
 IndustrialMusicals.com. 
 My Bathroom is a Private Kind of Place - from the 1969 American Standard industrial musical, The Bathrooms are Coming. 
 Take it from here – Xerox 
 That's Show Biz! – Goodyear, for a plastic wrap for meats.
 Gotta get a car – Oldsmobile
 The Grip Of Leadership; People Power – Musicals for Coca-Cola
 Spirit of '66 – JC Penney
 A Chevrolet sales convention musical, a film in the Prelinger archives.
 Corporate and IT anthems, originally collected by Peter Judge at Zdnet.
 That Agency Thing, CBS Radio Spot Sales (1963), by Bob Thompson and Alan Alch.

Sponsorships
Musical theatre
Sponsored plays and musicals